Alexandru Dedov (born 26 July 1989) is a Moldovan football midfielder who plays for Zimbru.

Career statistics

International goals 
Scores and results list Moldova's goal tally first.'

Honours
FK Ventspils	
 Virsliga: 2008
Dacia Chişinău
 Moldovan National Division: 2010–11
Sheriff Tiraspol
 Moldovan National Division: 2011–12
Zimbru Chișinău
Moldovan Cup: 2013-14
Moldovan Supercup: 2014

References

External links
 
 
 Profile at zimbru.md

1989 births
Living people
Moldovan footballers
Moldovan expatriate footballers
Association football midfielders
FK Ventspils players
FC Zimbru Chișinău players
FC Sheriff Tiraspol players
ASA 2013 Târgu Mureș players
Zira FK players
FC Dacia Chișinău players
FC Academia Chișinău players
FC Milsami Orhei players
CS Petrocub Hîncești players
Liga I players
Azerbaijan Premier League players
Moldovan Super Liga players
Latvian Higher League players
Moldovan expatriate sportspeople in Romania
Moldovan expatriate sportspeople in Latvia
Moldovan expatriate sportspeople in Azerbaijan
Expatriate footballers in Romania
Expatriate footballers in Latvia
Expatriate footballers in Azerbaijan
Moldova international footballers
Footballers from Chișinău